There is a small community of Indians in Argentina who are mainly immigrants from India and the neighboring countries in South America and the Caribbean with Indo-Caribbean influence (i.e. Guyana, Trinidad and Tobago and Suriname) and some of whom were born in Argentina and are of Indian heritage.

History
The first Indians to arrive in Argentina were Sikhs from the Indian state of Punjab who came to Argentina in the early 20th century to work on a British-built railroad. In the 1970s, others came after being barred entry to Canada and the United States, the preferred destinations, along with Britain, for the emigrants.

Argentina seemed the most promising of South American nations, and so they stayed, eventually concentrating in the north, which reminded them of the scrappy mountains and plains of Punjab. Most of the immigrants settled in Rosario de la Frontera. This remote northern Argentine town is home to the only Sikh gurdwara in South America. Today, there are about 300 Sikhs in Argentina, many of whom run supermarkets and other shops. Mixed marriages with Catholic Argentines are common.

A large number of Indians living in Buenos Aires are businessmen, doctors, financial or business executives, and employees of multinational corporations. Most of them have retained their Indian citizenship.
Many Indo-Caribbeans from places like Guyana, Trinidad and Tobago, and Suriname have also migrated to Argentina.

Culture
The Indian community in Argentina has established an Indian Association in the northern provinces to organize social and cultural events to celebrate Indian festivals such as Diwali. Some community members are involved in keeping traditional cultural practices alive, such as ayurveda, yoga, Indian classical music and the Hindustani language and Punjabi language.

See also

 Asian Latin Americans
 Hinduism in Argentina

References

Asian Argentine
Argentina
Argentina
Indian Latin American
Indians